Genelia Deshmukh (née D'Souza; born 5 August 1987) is an Indian actress and model who predominantly appears in Telugu, Hindi and Tamil language films. After gaining wide attention in a Parker Pen commercial with Amitabh Bachchan, D'Souza began her acting career with the box–office hit Tujhe Meri Kasam in 2003. She was recognized for her role in Boys the same year.

D'Souza received her first Filmfare Award in 2006 for her performance in the Telugu romantic comedy film Bommarillu, which earned her critical acclaim. In 2008, she gave critically acclaimed performances in Santosh Subramaniam, a Tamil remake of Bommarillu, and the Hindi film Jaane Tu... Ya Jaane Na. In addition to mainstream acting, D'Souza has hosted the television show Big Switch.

Her notable films include Satyam (2003), Sye (2004), Sachein (2005), Happy (2006), Dhee (2007), Ready (2008), Katha (2009), Urumi (2011), and the Hindi films Masti (2004), Jaane Tu... Ya Jaane Na (2008) and Force (2011). Having acted in several commercially successful movies in Telugu and Tamil, D'Souza was described as one of the leading actresses of the South Indian film industry in the 2000s.

Early life
Born in Mumbai, D'Souza is a Mangalorean Catholic. She was raised in the Bandra suburb of Mumbai. Her mother Jeanette D'Souza was a managing director of the Pharma Multinational corporation. She left her job in 2004 to help D'Souza with her career. Her father Neil D'Souza, is a senior official with Tata Consultancy Services. She also has a younger brother, Nigel D'Souza, who works with the Bombay Stock Exchange. According to D'Souza, her name means "rare" or "unique", and is a portmanteau of Jeanette and Neil, her mother and father's names. She is also often informally referred to as Geenu, her nickname. D'Souza studied at the Apostolic Carmel High School in Bandra and later joined St. Andrew's College in Bandra to pursue her bachelor's degree of Management Studies. She completed her degree while shooting for her first film, Tujhe Meri Kasam in 2003 and initially thought that an MNC job would suit her. She liked sports and studies in college, and was a state level athlete, sprinter, and a national level football player

D'Souza did her first modeling assignment at the age of 15, the result of being spotted as the bridesmaid at a wedding. She was selected for the Parker Pen commercial with Amitabh Bachchan, just two days before her exams, and had to shoot the next day. Initially she refused, because of her exam the next day, but the director persuaded D'Souza to shoot for the commercial. She gained wide attention from the Parker Pen commercial with Amitabh Bachchan, who said "she was good, and her expressions were spontaneous". She further did a Fair & Lovely 2003 Cricket World Cup advertisement with cricketer Krishnamachari Srikkanth.

Acting career

Debut and breakthrough (2003–2005)
When D'Souza was offered a role in Tujhe Meri Kasam, initially she turned it down, as she was not keen to pursue a career in acting. But the crew insisted and kept contacting her for two months, and she agreed when she saw the Telugu version of the film. Tamil director, S. Shankar, was impressed with her performance in the Parker Pen commercial and decided to cast her in a leading role in his 2003 Tamil film Boys. D'Souza was selected among 300 girls, who had auditioned for the movie. She signed three movies simultaneously in three different languages, Tujhe Meri Kasam (Hindi), Boys (Tamil), and Satyam (Telugu).

D'Souza's professional film career began, with her Hindi film debut Tujhe Meri Kasam in 2003. Film critic Taran Adarsh noted, "D'Souza is a wonderful performer. She catches you unaware with a performance that's natural to the core." The film was a box–office success. However, it could not do much to propel her career in Hindi cinema. Later, she decided to act in South Indian films. The same year, she made her Tamil debut as the teenage girl Harini in Boys, a story about 5 teenagers having stereotypical teen–boy fantasies. The movie, though noted for its vulgar sexual content, was a box–office success, and subsequently she started receiving Telugu film offers. She left Tamil cinema for a while to concentrate on the Telugu film industry. She made her Telugu debut in 2003 as a medical student in Satyam. Sify noted in their review that, "D'Souza is excellent as her body language is her major asset." The film was well received, and it raised her profile in the Telugu film industry.

In 2004, D'Souza appeared in her second Hindi film, Masti. The comedy focuses on 3 close friends who reunite after 3 years, but are now married and are being harassed by their wives. D'Souza portrayed the character of one of the wives. Taran Adarsh was complimentary of D'Souza's role, saying, "Amongst the wives, D'Souza is the best, [...] D'Souza looks the stern and demanding wife and is sure to be noticed." The film was a box–office success. The same year, she appeared in two Telugu movies Samba, and Sye, both succeeding at the box–office.

After appearing in her first Telugu movie in 2005, Naa Alludu, she starred in the Tamil romantic entertainer Sachein. A review in The Hindu noted, "D'Souza, who hardly made an impression in Boys, makes much impact in Sachein." The movie evoked mixed response from audiences, but was well received with the younger generation. She later appeared in the Telugu patriotic film Subhash Chandra Bose.

Turning point in South Indian films and recognition (2006–2008)
The year 2006 marked a significant turning point in D'Souza's career. She completed two Telugu movies in early 2006, one was the romantic comedy Happy, and the other was Raam. She then portrayed the role of Haasini, a vibrant, effervescent and a happy–go–lucky young girl, in the 2006 Telugu romantic comedy Bommarillu. The film was a blockbuster at the box–office, and grossed  in India, and also won the 2006 Golden Nandi award. Her performance received high praise, and garnered her the Telugu Filmfare Award for Best Actress, besides the Nandi Special Jury Award and the Santosham Award for Best Actress. Sify concluded about her acting in their review that, "The scene stealer is D'Souza with her innocent looks and cute mannerisms. She does not overact and we just fall in love with her character. D'Souza looks like a dream in chic skirts and is the life of the party and raises the bar of the film."

Following the success of Bommarillu, D'Souza played the role of the daughter of a local don, in the Tamil gangster film Chennai Kadhal alongside Boys co–star Bharath. Rediff.com criticized her commenting, "D'Souza stands up yet again to prove the point that if you are pretty and well dressed, you can get away with anything, without acting." Shortly afterwards in 2007, D'Souza played the role of sister of a notorious gangster in the blockbuster Telugu film Dhee, set against a gang war backdrop.

The following year, D'Souza appeared in the 2008 Telugu romantic thriller Mr. Medhavi, in which she portrayed the role of a student from Canada. The film was successful, with Rediff.com complimenting her performance saying, "D'Souza is her effervescent self – full of joie–de–vivre and lights up the screen." She made her Kannada debut in Satya in Love the same year. Later, she was cast in a leading role in Santosh Subramaniam, a Tamil remake of Bommarillu. The film also turned out to be rather successful as its predecessor. Sify described D'Souza's portrayal as "the soul of the film" and the film's "biggest strength", however Rediff.com described her character as "appears a little too good to be true."

Return to Hindi cinema, subsequent work and success (2008–2016)

In June 2008, following a nearly 5–year hiatus in Hindi cinema, she appeared in Mere Baap Pehle Aap, which failed to make profit at the box–office. A Rediff review noted, "besides her apparent cuteness, brings in tons of freshness and traits to the youthful characters she chooses to play", while a Sify review criticized her stating, "D'Souza is sprightly but has a standard two–three expressions bank in this film." She later appeared in the Telugu love story Ready alongside Ram, which was well received. 

Her breakthrough performance came with the blockbuster romantic comedy–drama Jaane Tu... Ya Jaane Na (2008), in which she portrayed the central character of Aditi Mahant, which was a major commercial success across India and overseas, grossing . Her role was widely admired for her sweetness and freshness, and new style of acting, with Rediff describing her acting as a "spark that has been missing in Hindi cinema for well over a decade now".

In that same year, D'Souza acted in the Telugu romantic comedy Sasirekha Parinayam. The film received favorable reviews, and Sify noted in their review that, "The life of the film is definitely D'Souza and she has shown the varied emotions from innocence, sadness, romance and anger in equal proportions without a hitch."

In 2009, D'Souza was cast in the Hindi film Life Partner, in which she was criticized for her performance. Indian film critic Rajeev Masand commented, "The adorable little imp from Jaane Tu… Ya Jaane Na has turned into a nagging harridan in this film, and how you wish she'd immediately enroll for acting lessons." Her next appearance in 2009 was in the Telugu thriller Katha, which was well received, and for which she won the 2009 Nandi Special Jury Award. In 2010, D'Souza appeared in Chance Pe Dance and Orange, both receiving poor reviews from critics, but her Uthama Puthiran was a moderate success in Tamil.

D'Souza had a major role in 2011, starring as the Muslim warrior princess Arackal Ayesha, in her debut Malayalam film Urumi. The film is about a fictional story happening in Calicut, Kerala during the 15th century, about a boy who plots to assassinate the Portuguese explorer Vasco Da Gama. She learned horse riding, and spent two weeks of training to use the sword, the short stick, and movements of the Dravidian martial art Kalarippayattu. The film portrayed her image makeover from a typical girl–next–door roles to more serious roles. Her next appearance was in the Hindi action thriller Force, which received mixed reviews from critics, with Taran Adarsh of Bollywood Hungama noting that D'Souza is strikingly sweet and subdued. She played the role of a journalist alongside leading actor Vijay in Velayudham, which was also commercially successful. She appeared in Tere Naal Love Ho Gaya and Naa Ishtam in 2012 and in cameo appearances in Jai Ho and Lai Bhaari in 2014. In 2016, she appeared in a cameo role of Maya in Force 2.

Role as producer and return to acting (2018–present) 
D'Souza became producer for her husband's Marathi film Mauli, where she also appeared in a song.

D'Souza will make her comeback to full time acting after 10 years with Riteish in Bhushan Kumar's Mister Mummy, star in the Marathi film Ved directed by Riteish, and will also return to South industry after 10 years with a Telugu–Kannada bilingual, film Production No.15.

Personal life

D'Souza is deeply religious and says that, she regularly attends Sunday Mass at St. Anne's Parish (Bandra), and whenever the family is home, a part of their evening is reserved for saying the rosary together. In an interview with The Times of India, she comments, "I keep a Novena every Wednesday at St. Michael's Church in Mahim." In an interview with Daily News and Analysis, she said that "My communication with God is conversational, [...] I'm God's favourite child; I believe that God has always been kind to me." Tabloids repeatedly linked D'Souza romantically with Ritesh Deshmukh, ever since they starred together in their debut film Tujhe Meri Kasam in 2003. They were reportedly ready to get engaged, but Ritesh's father, the then–Maharashtra Chief Minister, Vilasrao Deshmukh did not agree. D'Souza later denied any rumors of a relationship with Deshmukh, and responds that she was just friends with him. However, the couple eventually got married on 3 February 2012, according to Marathi marriage traditions in a Hindu wedding ceremony, they had a Christian wedding in the church on next day. The couple's first child, a son named Riaan, was born on 25 November 2014. Their second son, Rahyl, was born on 1 June 2016.

Other work and events
D'Souza was a part of Tamil director Mani Ratnam's stage show, Netru, Indru, Naalai, an event which seeks to raise funds for The Banyan, a voluntary organisation which rehabilitates homeless women with mental illness in Chennai. She was one of the judges at the grand finale of Gladrags Mega Model and Manhunt 2009 contest on 28 March 2009. She also walked the ramp alongside Tushar Kapoor for fashion designer Manish Malhotra at the Lakme Fashion Week 2009 on 28 March 2009. On 5 April 2009, D'Souza was among several Hindi film celebrities to perform at the Pantaloons Femina Miss India 2009 finale in Mumbai. In October 2009, she appeared as a showstopper for jewellery designer Farah Khan Ali on the second season of Housing Development and Infrastructure Limited (HDIL) India Couture Week. On 24 October 2009, D'Souza began hosting 'Big Switch, a television show based on slum kids on UTV Bindass channel to reach a bigger audience.

D'Souza has been the brand ambassador of Fanta, Virgin Mobile India, Fastrack, LG Mobiles, Garnier Light, Margo, and Perk in India. She has unveiled Spinz Black Magic deodorant on 7 October 2009 in Mumbai, and the Ceres Store retail outlet. At the Chennai International Fashion Week (CIFW) in December 2009, she appeared as a showstopper for designer Ishita Singh's spring–summer indigenous collection of 2010. She also holds a Limca world record of delivering four different super hit films in four different languages, Ready (Telugu), Satya in Love (Kannada), Santosh Subramaniam (Tamil), and Jaane Tu... Ya Jaane Na (Hindi) in a span of one calendar year.

She was a part of online market portal eBay's 2010 "Dream House" challenge, where she transformed an empty three–room apartment in Bandra into an attractive home with online shopping. On the occasion of Children's Day (14 November), D'Souza auctioned a few items from the apartment. All proceeds received from the auction was given to Aseema, a Non–governmental organization (NGO), which aims to provide education to underprivileged children.

In the media

D'Souza has been often tagged in the media as the "bubbly girl", after portraying the role of a young energetic girl in several movies, particularly in Bommarillu (2006) and Jaane Tu... Ya Jaane Na (2008). She appeared alongside Shahid Kapoor on the fourth episode of Tere Mere Beach Mein, a celebrity chat show, hosted by Farah Khan. The theme of the show was "Second Innings", since both D'Souza and Kapoor had the same history of failures initially and success later in their acting careers. In June 2010, D'Souza was crowned as the "Brand Ambassador of the Year" at the CNBC Awaaz consumer awards, for endorsing nine brands. She is now the brand ambassador of the soft drink Fanta (replacing Rani Mukherjee), the chocolate Perk (replacing Preity Zinta), Virgin Mobile India (along with Ranbir Kapoor), Fastrack watches and accessories, LG mobiles (along with John Abraham and Abhay Deol), Garnier Light fairness cream, Dabur Vatika hair oil, Margo soap, and Spinz deodorant.

Controversies
In June 2010, she was the subject of a controversy, when a Tamil daily reported that she had attended the controversial 2010 IIFA Awards in Colombo. Several Hindi film actors and the South Indian film industry had boycotted the event, over the alleged killing of Tamilian civilians at the height of the conflict between the Sri Lanka Army and the Liberation Tigers of Tamil Eelam (LTTE) in 2009. The rumours of her visit to Colombo started after her friend Ritesh Deshmukh was seen at the festival in Colombo. Immediately, various Tamil groups and Kollywood associations demanded her films to be banned.

In 2011, a controversy broke out for her film Force, in a wedding sequence scene of herself and John Abraham. Sources claim that the wedding ceremony and rituals conducted were so authentic that they would have actually been husband and wife in real life. Instead of a junior artiste, a real priest was called for the scene. Again, following the reports of Ritesh Deshmukh and D'Souza's marriage plans, the priest landed up at producer Vipul Amrutlal Shah's office to register a complaint. He insisted that the couple couldn't get married, as D'Souza has been already married to John Abraham, as all marriage rituals were observed, from wearing a mangalsutra'' (a sacred thread is worn by Indian women as a symbol of their marriage), to exchanging garlands, and taking the seven steps around the holy fire. Shah dismissed the claims as a publicity stunt.

Filmography

Films

Television

Awards and nominations

See also

 List of Hindi film actresses

References

External links

 
 
 
 Genelia D'Souza at Yahoo! Movies

Living people
Actresses in Tamil cinema
Actresses in Telugu cinema
Indian film actresses
Actresses in Hindi cinema
Indian Roman Catholics
Athletes from Mumbai
1987 births
St. Andrew's College of Arts, Science and Commerce alumni
Indian women television presenters
Indian television presenters
Actresses in Kannada cinema
Actresses in Malayalam cinema
Filmfare Awards South winners
21st-century Indian actresses
Marathi people
People from Marathwada
Kalarippayattu practitioners
Indian female martial artists
Sportswomen from Maharashtra
21st-century Indian women
21st-century Indian people
Actresses from Mumbai
Female models from Mumbai